The large-headed sea snake (Hydrophis pacificus) is sea snake in the family Elapidae native to waters off northern Australia.

References

Hydrophis
Reptiles described in 1896
Snakes of Australia